The Lying Truth is a 1922 American silent drama film written and directed by Marion Fairfax and starring Noah Beery, Marjorie Daw and Tully Marshall.

Cast
 Noah Beery as Lawrence De Muidde
 Marjorie Daw as Sue De Muidde
 Tully Marshall as Horace Todd
 Pat O'Malley as Bill O'Hara
 Charles Hill Mailes as Sam Clairborne Sr 
 Claire McDowell as 	Mrs. Sam Clairborne
 Adele Watson as 	Ellie Clairborne
 George Dromgold as Sam Clairborne
 Robert Brauer as Mose
 Wade Boteler as Bill O'Hara Sr

References

Bibliography
 Connelly, Robert B. The Silents: Silent Feature Films, 1910-36, Volume 40, Issue 2. December Press, 1998.
 Munden, Kenneth White. The American Film Institute Catalog of Motion Pictures Produced in the United States, Part 1. University of California Press, 1997.

External links
 

1922 films
1922 drama films
1920s English-language films
American silent feature films
Silent American drama films
American black-and-white films
1920s American films